The paramo ground tyrant (Muscisaxicola alpinus), also known as the paramo ground-tyrant, is a species of bird in the tyrant flycatcher family, Tyrannidae. plain-capped ground tyrant (M. griseus) was formerly considered to be a subspecies of M. alpinus but is now commonly treated as a separate species. The name "plain-capped ground tyrant" is sometimes used for M. alpinus.

It is found in Colombia and Ecuador. Its natural habitats are subtropical or tropical high-altitude shrubland and subtropical or tropical high-altitude grassland.

References

Muscisaxicola
Birds described in 1849
Páramo fauna
Taxonomy articles created by Polbot